Dabhro(), is a village in Kandiaro Taluka of Naushahro Feroze District, Sindh, Pakistan. It is also the administrative headquarter of the Dabhro Union Council.

References

Kandiaro Taluka
Naushahro Feroze District
Union councils of Sindh